Trishakti is a 1999 Indian Bollywood film directed by Madhur Bhandarkar. It stars Arshad Warsi, Sharad Kapoor, Milind Gunaji and Radhika in pivotal roles.

Plot
Rajeshwar Raja is the uncrowned don of the criminal world in Bombay, India. Working under his directions are Hasan Lalla and Hamid Pathan. Then Hasan Lalla decides to separate, and forms his own gang, which does not augur well with Raja. Things get worse between the two, resulting in a gang war resulting in many casualties on both sides, with the police stepping in and taking advantage of this situation. Then one day while Hamid is being attacked by Hasan's men, three men, Bajrang, Sagar Malhotra, and Mahesh alias Munnabhai, come to his rescue, and ensure that he is admitted in hospital for his injuries. A grateful Raja recruits the three in his gang, and asks them to attempt to bring Hasan down, which they agree to do. When the underworld finds out about the daring deeds of these three, and the manner in which Hasan has been subdued and forced to retreat, they start believing that Raja is no longer in control, resulting in Raja feeling threatened, and deciding to end his relationship with these three. He plots to creates misunderstandings, and enlists a devious scheme in which Mahesh and Sagar are arrested by the police, and Bajrang becomes the one who is responsible. A visibly upset Bajrang tries to clarify things to his two friends, but to no avail. It looks like Raja has once again succeeded in his overtures to be the sole and unchallenged don of the criminal underworld.

Cast
 Arshad Warsi...Sagar Malhotra
 Sharad Kapoor...Mahesh
 Milind Gunaji...Commanda Bajrang (Bodyguard of Raj Narain)
 Keerthi Chawla...Priyanka
 Sadashiv Amrapurkar...Inspector Dayal
 Jatin Kanakia...Home Minister Vishwanath Pradhan
 Shehzad Khan...Inspector Tiwari
 Govind Namdeo...Hasan Lalla
 Ashish Vidyarthi...Rajeshwar Raja
 Tiku Talsania...Laxmiprasad (Priyanka's dad)
 Himani Shivpuri...Mrs. Laxmiprasad
 Anil Nagrath...Minister Raj Narain
 Tej Sapru...Hamid Pathan

Soundtrack
Music composed by Rajesh Roshan, while Mehboob wrote the songs for the soundtrack.

References

External links

1990s Hindi-language films
1999 films
Films scored by Rajesh Roshan
1999 directorial debut films